Kushlukia is an extinct genus of prehistoric bony fish, closely related to the luvar, that lived during the lower Eocene.  K. permira is from Eocene portion of the Danata Formation Lagerstatten (which otherwise spans the Thanetian epoch of the Paleocene to the Lowest Eocene), of Turkmenistan.  A second, as yet undescribed species is from the Fuller's Earth formation Lagerstatten in the Barmer District, of Ypresian Rajasthan, India.

See also

 Avitoluvarus
 Prehistoric fish
 List of prehistoric bony fish

References

Luvaridae
Eocene fish of Asia